Lauren Pritchard (born June 17, 1977) is an American comedy actress. Pritchard is most notable for her membership in the recurring cast of comedians on sketch comedy series MADtv during its fourteenth season.

Biography

Early years
Pritchard was born in 1977 in Orlando, Florida. She trained as a ballet dancer and danced from age two until she was twenty years old. She toured with the Nutcracker and auditioned for ABT and Miami ballet theater. Pritchard began taking improv classes in 1991 in Orlando, Florida at SAK theatre, with Wayne Brady as her first improv teacher. She was hired by Disney in 1995 and she appeared in Equity shows at EPCOT.

In 2002, Lauren joined the main company of ComedySportz Los Angeles. In addition to improvising, she also currently directs the organization's Sunday Team.

Career

MADtv
Pritchard joined the cast of MADtv in 2008 as a featured player for the show's final season (season 14; 2008–2009). Pritchard had no recurring characters, but she was known for her impressions of Candy Crowley, Jo Frost, and Elizabeth II of the United Kingdom.

Impressions

Filmography

See also
ComedySportz

References

External links

MADtv fan site
ComedySportz LA Roster

1977 births
Living people
21st-century American actresses
American women comedians
American people of Welsh descent
American television actresses
American sketch comedians
Actresses from Orlando, Florida
21st-century American comedians